is a Japanese professional footballer who plays as a left back for J1 League club Cerezo Osaka.

International
He made his Japan national football team debut on 20 November 2018 in a friendly against Kyrgyzstan and scored a goal in the second minute of the eventual 4–0 victory.

Club statistics
Updated to 2 December 2018.

1Includes Japanese Super Cup.

National team statistics

International goals
Scores and results list Japan's goal tally first.

Honours
Emperor's Cup: 2012
Japanese Super Cup: 2012
J. League Cup: 2013

References

External links

Profile at Yokohama F. Marinos 
Profile at Kashiwa Reysol

1993 births
Living people
People from Kashiwa
Association football people from Chiba Prefecture
Japanese footballers
Japan youth international footballers
Japan international footballers
J1 League players
J2 League players
J3 League players
Kashiwa Reysol players
JEF United Chiba players
Yokohama F. Marinos players
Urawa Red Diamonds players
Cerezo Osaka players
J.League U-22 Selection players
Footballers at the 2014 Asian Games
Association football defenders
Asian Games competitors for Japan